Alan Randy May (born January 14, 1965) is a Canadian former professional ice hockey player and current analyst. He played in the National Hockey League with five teams between 1988 and 1995.

Playing career
May began his NHL career when he was signed as a free agent by the Boston Bruins, although he would spend most of his time in the minors. He later moved on to the Edmonton Oilers; again, he spent most of his time in the minors. It was only after his trade to the Washington Capitals in June 1989 that he enjoyed a bigger role.  During his almost five seasons with the Capitals, his gritty, hard-nosed style of play made him a fan favorite, and helped the team reach the semifinals for the first time, in 1990. May remains the Capitals' single season leader in penalty minutes with 339, which he set during the 1989-90 season. May also played for the Dallas Stars and Calgary Flames before finishing his NHL career.

May was once believed to be the first player from the ECHL to play in the National Hockey League, but May never played in the ECHL. He was a member of the Atlantic Coast Hockey League's Thunderbirds during his 1986-87 season, and the ECHL was not founded until the 1988-89 season.
However, May is the first member of the Carolina Thunderbirds to reach the NHL without prior professional experience.  

In 393 NHL games, he scored 31 goals and 45 assists, and amassed 1,348 penalty minutes.

May was traded at the NHL trade deadline four times in his career. This record was equaled by Thomas Vanek in 2018.

Post-playing career
In 1999 he coached the short-lived Dallas Stallions roller-hockey team.

He currently is a hockey analyst for NBC Sports Washington (rinkside on all home games and studio analyst for all road games). Alan is married to Sherayne and has three children.

Career statistics

Regular season and playoffs

References

External links
 

1965 births
Living people
Abilene Aviators players
Boston Bruins players
Brandon Wheat Kings players
Calgary Flames players
Canadian ice hockey right wingers
Cape Breton Oilers players
Carolina Thunderbirds players
Dallas Stars players
Denver Grizzlies players
Detroit Vipers players
Edmonton Oilers players
Houston Aeros (1994–2013) players
Ice hockey people from Alberta
Maine Mariners players
Medicine Hat Tigers players
New Haven Nighthawks players
New Westminster Bruins players
Nova Scotia Oilers players
Orlando Solar Bears (IHL) players
Springfield Indians players
Undrafted National Hockey League players
Washington Capitals players